Hubert Edward Hassard Short (15 October 1877 – 9 October 1956), usually known as Hassard Short, was an actor, stage director, set designer and lighting designer in musical theatre
who directed over 50 Broadway and West End shows between 1920 and 1953. Theatre historian Ken Bloom called him "one of Broadway's greatest directors and lighting designers", while theatre writer John Kenrick described him as a "groundbreaking director and choreographer".

After 25 years acting on stage and in films, Short turned to directing and designing in 1920.  He made many innovations in stage lighting and design, including the first permanent lighting bridge (Music Box Revue, 1921) and first the use of a revolving stage in a Broadway musical (The Band Wagon, 1931).  He continued to direct until 1952.

Early life and acting career

Short was born in Edlington, Lincolnshire into the English landed gentry, the elder son of Edward Hassard Short and Geraldine Rachel Blagrave. He left school aged fifteen to seek a career on the stage. He made his first acting appearance in London in 1895 before being brought to New York City by producer Charles Frohman in 1901, where he continued to appear on stage until 1919. He also acted in five silent films between 1917 and 1921, the last being Woman's Place.

Directing and stagecraft career
Short's first experience of directing was the 1908 hit Broadway play The Man from Home. Alongside his acting work, he  directed The Lambs Club Gambols, annual benefit productions, from 1911 to 1913. During the 1919 Actors' Equity Association strike he staged a series of four all-star fundraising shows, which were so well received that he decided his future lay in directing and stagecraft; a small advertisement in The New York Times in July 1920 announced "his intention of becoming a vaudeville impresario on a large scale", as well as his appointment by producer Joseph Weber as director of the operetta Honeydew.  In this production an electrician operated overhead spotlights above the stage from a bosun's chair, the first of Short's many innovations in stage lighting.

His first major hits as a stage director came with the series of Music Box Revues from 1921 to 1923, which showcased Irving Berlin's songs. As well as innovative lighting, he included mechanical effects such as moving stages and elevators, though these were not received with universal approval: the critic Gilbert Seldes complained that "Hassard Short, confusing the dynamics of the theatre with mere hoisting power, moves everything that can be moved except the audience." In 1921 he staged a historic Shakespearean pageant with many of Broadway's leading men and women in a fundraiser for Actor's Equity.

Short adapted well to the more limited budgets of the 1930s by staging revues, including many collaborations with producer Max Gordon and choreographer Albertina Rasch. In Three's a Crowd (1930), he dispensed with footlights for the first time on the New York stage by attaching lights to the balcony railing. He staged the groundbreaking 1931 revue The Band Wagon on double revolving turntables, allowing rapid scene changes.  His opulent staging of The Great Waltz (1934), financed by John D. Rockefeller, was an exception to the tightened purse-strings of the time and confounded many critics by becoming a hit in both New York and London.

His wartime hits included Lady in the Dark (1941), Something for the Boys (1943) and Carmen Jones (1943), for which he won the first Donaldson Award for best musical direction. Short continued to work into his seventies: he staged a successful revival of Show Boat in 1948, and staged and did the lighting for the revue, Make Mine Manhattan (1948).  The last show he worked on was My Darlin' Aida, which opened in 1952.

Private life
A homosexual in a closeted era, Short enjoyed a long-lasting relationship with Billy Ladd, a former chorus dancer. Short retired to the South of France in 1952, and died there in 1956.

Filmography

Stage productions
Among the more notable productions that Short staged are the following (original productions unless stated otherwise):

References

Further reading
Sederholm, Jack Paul (1974). The musical directing career and stagecraft contributions of Hassard Short, 1919-1952 (Dissertation, 621 pages). ETD Collection for Wayne State University. Paper AAI7513386.

1877 births
1956 deaths
British emigrants to the United States
American musical theatre directors
Donaldson Award winners
English gay actors
People from East Lindsey District
Broadway theatre directors
Broadway set designers